My Little Fire-Filled Heart is the second studio album by Tara VanFlower, released in May 6, 2005 by Silber Records.

Reception

AllMusic awarded the My Little Fire-Filled Heart four out of five stars and said it "continues in the same striking, loving vein as her first -- it's the sound of someone confounding expectations based on her group work to make her own personal, entrancing statement. "

Track listing

Personnel
Adapted from the My Little Fire-Filled Heart liner notes.

Musicians
 Tara VanFlower – vocals, mixing, photography

Production and design
 Mike VanPortfleet – mastering, design

Release history

References

External links 
 My Little Fire-Filled Heart at Discogs (list of releases)
 My Little Fire-Filled Heart at iTunes

2005 albums
Tara VanFlower albums